Attinger is a surname. Notable people with the surname include:

Alexander Attinger (born 1986), Swiss curler
Bernhard Attinger (born 1953), Swiss curler
Kurt Attinger (died 2011), Swiss curler
Peter Attinger Jr. (born 1951), Swiss curler
Ruedi Attinger, Swiss curler
Sandra Ramstein-Attinger, Swiss curler
Werner Attinger, Swiss curler

Swiss-German surnames